Lie Down with Lions is a 1985 spy novel by Ken Follett. The book was published by Signet in paperback. Today it is available in print, CD and audiobook formats.

In 1994 it was made into a TV miniseries directed by Jim Goddard and starring Timothy Dalton and Marg Helgenberger that received mixed reviews.

References

1985 British novels
Novels by Ken Follett
Hamish Hamilton books
Novels set in Afghanistan